The Belgium women's national softball team is the softball team representing Belgium in international games and tournaments.

It is governed by the Koninklijke Belgische Baseball- en Softbalbond (Royal Belgian Baseball- and Softball Federation) and participates in international tournaments of the supranational softball organisations ESF and ISF, like the European championship and the world championship. As of 2013, the team attended one world championship and 15 European championships. In the first seven European softball tournaments, the Belgian team earned five medals.

World Championship 
The team competed at the 1994 ISF Women's World Championship in St. John's, Newfoundland where they finished thirteenth.

European Championship 

Red border colour indicates tournament was held on home soil.

References

External links 
 Official website KBBSF
 European Softball Federation
 International Softball Federation

Women's national softball teams
Women's national sports teams of Belgium
Softball in Belgium